The 1964 Peruvian Segunda División, the second division of Peruvian football (soccer), was played by 10 teams. The tournament winner, Defensor Arica was promoted to the 1965 Peruvian Primera División.

Results

Standings

External links
 Segunda División 1964 - Defensor Arica

Peruvian Segunda División seasons
Peru2
2